Montégut or Montegut may refer to the following people and places:

France 

Montégut, Gers, a commune in the Gers department 
Montégut, Landes, a commune in the Landes department 
Montégut, Hautes-Pyrénées, a commune in the Hautes-Pyrénées department

USA  

Montegut, Louisiana

People 
 Jean-Baptiste Joseph Émile Montégut (1825 - 1895), a French critic
 Joseph Edgard Montegut, a mayor of New Orleans (Louisiana, U.S.) during the 1840s